Chinnagottigallu mandal is one of the 34 mandals in Tirupati district in the Indian state of Andhra Pradesh. It is a part of Tirupati revenue division with its headquarters at Chinnagottigallu.

History 
Chinnagottigallu mandal was a part of Chittoor district under Madanapalle revenue division until 2022. It was made part of the newly formed Tirupati district under Tirupati revenue division effective from 4 April 2022 by the Y. S. Jagan Mohan Reddy-led Government of Andhra Pradesh.

Demographics 

It had a sex ratio of 1008. Scheduled Castes and Scheduled Tribes made up 4,702 and 905 of the population respectively. It had a literacy rate of 66.67% with 76.97% among males and 56.45% among females.

Administration 
Chinnagottigallu mandal is a part of Tirupati revenue division. Its headquarters are located at Chinnagottigallu. As of 2011 census, the mandal comprises the following 10 villages:

Politics 
Chinnagottigallu mandal is one of the 7 mandals under Chandragiri Assembly constituency, which in turn is a part of Chittoor Lok Sabha constituency of Andhra Pradesh. , the mandal had 18,592 eligible voters with 9,179 male voters and 9,412 female voters. Chevireddy Bhaskar Reddy is representing the Chandragiri constituency as the Member of the Legislative Assembly (MLA) in Andhra Pradesh Legislative Assembly, and N. Reddeppa is representing the Chittoor constituency as the Member of Parliament (MP) in Lok Sabha.

References 

Mandals in Tirupati district